Lisandro José Pérez Verenzuela (born 7 June 2000) is a Venezuelan professional footballer who plays as a forward for Venezuelan club Academia Puerto Cabello.

Professional career
Pérez made his professional debut with Academia Puerto Cabello on the first matchday of the 2018 season, which also happened to be the club's debut in the Venezuelan Primera División. He played the full 90 minutes of a 0–0 league draw against Metropolitanos. He scored his first goal just over three months later, netting the game-winner during a 1–0 victory over Estudiantes de Caracas on 6 April. He received great praise for his performance from the Venezuelan media. By the end of the season, he had begun to attract international attention.

In June 2019, Pérez was loaned out to Uruguayan Primera División club Boston River on a one-year deal.

International career
Pérez was called up to the Venezuela national under-20 team in August 2018 for friendlies in the United States and in Qatar. He made his youth international debut on 10 September against Qatar. He then traveled with the team to Spain for a handful of friendlies in preparation for the 2019 South American U-20 Championship.

Career statistics

Club

References

External links
 
 

2000 births
Living people
Venezuelan footballers
Venezuela under-20 international footballers
Venezuelan expatriate footballers
Association football forwards
Academia Puerto Cabello players
Boston River players
Venezuelan Primera División players
Uruguayan Primera División players
Venezuelan expatriate sportspeople in Uruguay
Expatriate footballers in Uruguay
People from Apure